Lithospermum rodriguezii is a flowering plant of the family Boraginaceae found in Peru, particularly in Amotape District and Huancabamba Province.

References

External links

rodriguezii
Flora of Peru